General elections were held in Saint Kitts-Nevis-Anguilla on 24 June 1937, the first since the 1870s. The Workers' League nominated two candidates, Thomas Manchester and Edgar Challenger, both of whom were elected.

Background
The St Kitts Legislature was suspended in 1877, after which the colony was ruled by an appointed body. In December 1934 the Legislative Council debated reintroducing elected members, but the idea was rejected. However, following riots in St Kitts the following year, it was decided to restore elected members to the council.

Electoral system
The Council had five elected members, with each island acting as a constituency; St Kitts returned three members, whilst Anguilla and Nevis returned one each. The right to vote was restricted to those over the age of 21 who had an income of at least £30 per annum, owned property with a value of at least £100, paid at least £12 of rent per year, or had paid at least 15 shillings of direct tax in the previous year. As a result, there were a total of 1,629 registered voters; 1,168 in St Kitts, 328 in Nevis and 133 in Anguilla.

Results

References

Saint Kitts-Nevis-Anguilla
1937
1937
1937 in Saint Kitts-Nevis-Anguilla
June 1937 events
1937 elections in the British Empire